Mīrzā Lutfullāh Khān Tabrīzī, also known as Murshid Qulī Khān II, was an 18th-century administrator who served under the Nawabs of Bengal as the Naib Nazim of Jahangirnagar (Dhaka) and Orissa respectively. Lutfullah was also a calligrapher, as well as an author in the Persian language under the pen name Sarshār.

Azad al-Husaini's Naubahar-i-Murshid-Quli-Khani book is dedicated to Lutfullah, and celebrates him as the conqueror of Lower Tippera. This is because Tippera was only nominally under Mughal rule, and was fully annexed during Lutfullah's tenure as Naib Nazim.

Early life and family 
Mirza Lutfullah was born in 1684, in the Indian city of Surat in Gujarat. His father, Haji Shukrullah, was a Shi’ite Persian from the Safavid city of Tabriz who had migrated to Surat. Lutfullah studied under Aqa Habibullah Isfahani, another Persian immigrant to Surat and a senior student of Safavid scholar Agha Hossein Khansari.

After his father's death, Lutfullah left Surat for Bengal as a merchant where he gained popularity in the court of the Nawab of Bengal in Murshidabad. Shuja-ud-Din Muhammad Khan married off his daughter, Durdana Begum Sahiba, to Lutfullah. The couple had one son, Mirza Muhammad Yahya Khan Bahadur, and two daughters. Bangali Begum Sahiba, also known as Mehman Begum, was their eldest daughter, and their youngest daughter was the wife of Ala ud-din Muhammad Khan.

Career 
In 1728, Lutfullah was appointed by his father-in-law Nawab Shuja-ud-Din Muhammad Khan as the regional governor at Jahangirnagar. Along with this appointment, Lutfullah was given the title of Murshid Quli Khan II. During his tenure, Murshid Quli Khan II had shops constructed in Chowk Bazaar. As the Nizamat of Jahangirnagar covered all of eastern Bengal, Lutfullah's responsibility also spread outside of Dhaka. He is credited for the complete Mughal annexation of Lower Tippera, which was formally only nominally under Mughal rule.

In 1734, Lutfullah was transferred to govern the Nizamat of Orissa. The Battle of Giria near Murshidabad on 10 April 1740 meant the ascension of Alivardi Khan as the new Nawab of Bengal. Lutfullah rejected the authority of Alivardi. Along with his son-in-law Mirza Agha Baqer, Lutfullah proceeded from Cuttack in Orissa towards Balasore and towards December 1740, established a camp at Phulwari Sharif in Bihar. Lutfullah was severely wounded in battle and was defeated on 3 March 1741, later fleeing to Machilipatnam in South India with Baqer. Alivardi later appointed Syed Ahmad Khan as the Naib Nazim of Orissa.

In the Deccan, Lutfullah served the Nizam of Hyderabad and spent the rest of his life. In the literary sphere, his magnum opus is Makhmur.

|-

See also 
 History of Dhaka
Jahangir Nagar

References 

Rulers of Dhaka
Indian people of Iranian descent
Indian Shia Muslims
People from Tabriz
Mughal princes
18th-century Indian Muslims
18th-century Persian-language writers